Anatoliy Vasilyevich Samotsvetov (27 November 1932 – 17 August 2014) was a Soviet athlete who competed mainly in the hammer throw. He was born in Irkutsk, Irkutsk Oblast.

Samotsvetov competed for the USSR at the 1956 Summer Olympics held in Melbourne, Australia where he won the bronze medal. He trained at Burevestnik in Moscow.

References 

1932 births
2014 deaths
Russian male hammer throwers
Soviet male hammer throwers
Olympic bronze medalists for the Soviet Union
Athletes (track and field) at the 1956 Summer Olympics
Athletes (track and field) at the 1960 Summer Olympics
Olympic athletes of the Soviet Union
Burevestnik (sports society) athletes
Sportspeople from Irkutsk
Medalists at the 1956 Summer Olympics
Olympic bronze medalists in athletics (track and field)
Universiade medalists in athletics (track and field)
Universiade silver medalists for the Soviet Union
Medalists at the 1959 Summer Universiade